Cleveland is a rural locality in the local government area (LGA) of Northern Midlands in the Central LGA region of Tasmania. The 2016 census recorded a population of 45 for the state suburb of Cleveland.

History 
Cleveland was gazetted as a locality in 1972. 

It is believed to have been named in the 1830s for a breed of horses that were being imported and bred in the district.

Geography
Most of the boundaries are survey lines. The North-South Railway Line runs through from north to east.

Road infrastructure 

National Route 1 (Midland Highway) passes through from north to east.

References

Towns in Tasmania
Localities of Northern Midlands Council